Dichomeris frenigera is a moth in the family Gelechiidae. It was described by Edward Meyrick in 1913. It is found in Assam, India.

The forewings are dark violet fuscous, with slaty-grey reflections and a very fine whitish curved or bent line from two-thirds of the costa to the tornus. There is an ochreous-yellow or orange apical patch, with the anterior edge somewhat convex, enclosing two or three fuscous wedge-shaped spots on the termen. There is also a more or less developed fine black line around the apex and termen. The hindwings are rather dark fuscous.

References

Moths described in 1913
frenigera